George Joseph Sutor (September 14, 1943 – August 29, 2011) was a professional basketball center who played three seasons in the American Basketball Association as a member of the Kentucky Colonels (1967–68), the Minnesota Pipers (1968–69), the Carolina Cougars (1969–70), and the Miami Floridians (1969–70). He attended La Salle University.

On August 5, 2011, Sutor was involved in an ATV wreck in which the vehicle flipped over, causing a serious head injury. On the 29th of that same month, Sutor died at the age of 67.

References

External links

George Sutor Sr Obituary

1943 births
2011 deaths
American men's basketball players
Basketball players from Philadelphia
Carolina Cougars players
Centers (basketball)
Kentucky Colonels players
La Salle Explorers men's basketball players
Miami Floridians players
Minnesota Pipers players
Wilmington Blue Bombers players